Noreality is the fifth studio album by American rapper N.O.R.E. The album was released on August 28, 2007, by Babygrande Records. The album features guest appearances from Three 6 Mafia, Jadakiss, Kurupt, Capone, Swizz Beatz, Tru Life, J. Ru$$, Styles P, Kanye West, and more. Producers include EFN, Hazardis Sounds, SPK, Swizz Beatz, OZ and the Deacon, Dame Grease, Kyze and Racoon. The first single was "Set It Off," which features J. Ru$$ and Swizz Beatz.

Track listing

Charts

References

Babygrande Records albums
2007 albums
Albums produced by Swizz Beatz
N.O.R.E. albums
Albums produced by the Alchemist (musician)
Albums produced by Dame Grease